The Autovía A-35 (formerly known as the Almansa-Xàtiva highway) is a highway in the province of Valencia, Spain.

It connects Xàtiva and the N-340/ CV-40 to Almansa and the N-330 otherwise known as the Autovía de Levante.

References 

A-35
A-35
A-35